Antoni Lewek (1940–2010) was a Catholic priest, theologian, and academic. He was founder and first director of Institute for Media Education and Journalism at Cardinal Stefan Wyszyński University in Warsaw.

Ordained in 1963, Lewek specialized in homiletics and held faculty positions the Academy of Catholic Theology in Warsaw (1967–1971) and the Institut für Katechetik und Homiletik in Munich (1971–1973). In 1973, he became a researcher at Cardinal Stefan Wyszyński University. From 2002 to his death, he was director of the Institute for Media Education and Journalism there.

Lewek was an anticommunist and protested in the aftermath of the death of slain priest Jerzy Popiełuszko.

References 

Polish Roman Catholic theologians
1940 births
2010 deaths